Perdana Leadership Foundation is a foundation established to preserve, research and disseminate information on the past Prime Ministers of Malaysia. The foundation's main aim is to increase awareness of Malaysia's intellectual heritage based on its belief that past leadership can provide important resources and insights for future development. A tax-exempt, non-profit organisation, the Foundation intends to become the premier institution for the study of Malaysia’s past Prime Ministers and the central resource centre for research into national stewardship as well as a platform for reflection, debate, and discussion with distinguished figures in Malaysian leadership.

A broader objective is to initiate greater understanding and co-operation through research and idea-sharing, while inspiring a positive change in the values of Malaysians throughout the world.

Established in early 2003, the idea was mooted by Mathias Chang, Political Secretary to the Prime Minister and was well accepted by the government and private sectors. Thus, a special trust committee was formed with members mostly from private sector and headed by  Tan Sri Datuk Seri Azizan Zainul Abidin (President, Putrajaya Corporation; President, Petronas) to materialize this idea. The Foundation was launched by Prime Minister, Datuk Seri Abdullah Ahmad Badawi on 10 May 2005. Before that, Tun Dr. Mahathir Mohamad launched the Perdana Library on 29 April 2004.

Objectives 
Objectives of Perdana Leadership Foundation:

 To research, document, disseminate and publicise the intellectual legacies of Malaysia’s past prime ministers.
 To elucidate and illuminate the contribution of Malaysia’s past Prime Ministers in the social, economic and political development of the nation.
 To create awareness of the development process of the nation and serve as a platform for future development.
 To be a resource centre of policies, strategies and initiatives that were adopted under Malaysia’s various prime ministers which may be used and adapted as models for the development of other nations.

The Foundation’s broader objective is to promote global understanding by providing a channel for scholars and thinkers to undertake research and idea-sharing.

Administration 
Its Honorary President is the fourth & seventh prime minister, Tun Dr Mahathir Mohamad. The foundation also has a Board of Trustees, chaired by Tan Sri Dato' Azman Hashim, whose members are prominent figures in the banking, education and property sectors. Day-to-day management is headed by Tan Sri Datuk Nik Mohamed Nik Yaacob, formerly the CEO of Sime Darby Berhad.

Library 
The Foundation operates a physical and digital library, the Perdana Library which provides direct access to a wealth of information on Malaysia's past Prime Ministers. The Library collects, organises, preserves and disseminates materials by and about Malaysia's national leaders and events connected to them, and outlines the policies, strategies and initiatives they adopted. In line with the Foundation's objective of disseminating information on Malaysian leadership, these materials are digitised and are made available to the public through the Internet. To date, the Foundation has close to 10,000 items in its physical collections (including photos and audio video materials) and more than three hundred and thirty thousand records in its digital collections. Some of the Library's resources can be accessed for free via the Foundation's website while others are available only to members.

Digital Preservation Initiative 
The Foundation actively digitises materials connected to the leadership history of the country. These materials include speeches, books, news clippings, magazine articles, videos and audio tapes. It collaborates with the National Archives and the National Library to digitise these institutions' holdings (with a copy handed back to the source institution) and seeks to take this initiative nationwide to centralise and digitise materials of historical import. To date, the Foundation has digitised more than three hundred thirty thousand documents, equivalent to more than eight million pages, consisting of speeches of former PMs, news clippings, journal articles, and Parliamentary Hansards. In terms of technology, the Foundation has invested in a book scanning machine, OCR software and an upgraded search engine to enable more efficient research.

Building 
The building is located at Precinct 8, Putrajaya. This building is equipped with facilities such as a Library (Perdana Library), auditorium, meeting rooms, administrative offices and a banquet hall.

External links

References 

Organizations established in 2003
2003 establishments in Malaysia
Educational organisations based in Malaysia
Educational foundations
Foundations based in Malaysia
Non-profit organisations based in Malaysia
Organisations based in Putrajaya